Peter Kay's Car Share is a British sitcom set around supermarket assistant manager John Redmond (Peter Kay) and promotions rep Kayleigh Kitson (Sian Gibson), and their participation in a company car-sharing scheme. 

The first series was filmed in and around Greater Manchester: notably Peter Kay's native Bolton; and Manchester, Trafford and Salford. 

In December 2015, Kay confirmed a second and supposedly final series had been commissioned. It began airing on 11 April 2017. Filming locations for the second series included: Blair Drummond Safari Park, Bury, Burnley, Wirral and Southport. Peter Kay's Car Share won Best Comedy at the 2016, 2018 and 2019 National Television Awards, and the BAFTA TV Awards for Best Male Comedy Performance and Best Scripted Comedy at the 2016 BAFTA TV Awards.

The series came to an end in May 2018 when two special episodes broadcast on 7 and 28 May. The first of these, Peter Kay's Car Share Unscripted, was partially improvised but incorporated prepared radio material and visual gags.

The programme returned for an audio special in April 2020, amidst the COVID-19 pandemic.

Plot
The series focuses on supermarket assistant manager John Redmond (Kay) and promotions rep Kayleigh Kitson (Gibson), who are participating in their work's car-sharing scheme.

The first half of each episode shows John picking up Kayleigh from her house in his Fiat 500L and the pair having discussions about each other's lives as they travel to work. The second half of the episode follows the pair on the car journey home and they reveal what they did at work.

As they travel to and from work, John and Kayleigh listen to Forever FM; a fictitious radio station which has music alternating with terrible advertisements and promotions. In each episode, one or both of them (mostly Kayleigh) daydream about them creating a music video-style fantasy performance of a song played on the radio.

Surprising billboards at the roadside and on vehicles provide an additional source of interest ("Brazilian wax while you wait", "One meal for the price of two", "No pies left in this van overnight", "Shaun Ryder Rehab Centre", "HALALDI" and others), as well as the radio adverts and announcements.

One episode featured the ice cream van owned and driven by "Mr Softee Top", an ice cream man and porn video salesman who was the subject of the That Peter Kay Thing episode "The Ice Cream Man Cometh".

Cast
Peter Kay as John Redmond
Sian Gibson as Kayleigh Kitson
Danny Swarsbrick as Ted 2 (8 episodes)
Guy Garvey as Steve (4 episodes)
Vasant Mistry as Old Ted (2 episodes)
Gemma Facinelli as Rachel (2 episodes)
Rob Charles (Breakfast radio Presenter of Forever FM) (12 Episodes) 
Martin Emery (Drivetime radio Presenter of Forever FM) (12 Episodes)

Production
The series was commissioned in 2013 by the BBC, and was initially made available on BBC iPlayer. Inspiration for the show, for co-creators Tim Reid and Paul Coleman, included Alfred Molina and Dawn French in the BBC's Roger & Val Have Just Got In and The Smoking Room. Paul Coleman pitched the idea to Peter Kay, whom he had previously worked with on Max and Paddy's Road to Nowhere.
The programme was mainly filmed in and around Manchester, Farnworth (Bolton), Westhoughton, Horwich, Swinton, Bury, Walkden, Altrincham (Trafford) and Little Hulton (Salford). 

John and Kayleigh's place of work was portrayed as being the Manchester Fort retail park in the city's Cheetham Hill area, but was in reality filmed around the goods entrance and car park at the back of the large Halfords Autocentre off Viaduct Way in the Broadheath area of Altrincham. The exterior was dressed with fake windows containing large images of fresh fruit and vegetables, with car park features, trolleys, staff uniforms and signage in the style and colours of Tesco. In episode 3 of series 1 two members of Halfords staff in their gold and black uniforms can be seen in the unloading bay as John and Kayleigh drop off their colleague "Stink" Ray (Reece Shearsmith) the fishmonger.

The Forever FM presenters are voiced by Rob Charles (Mike on the "Mike and his Morning Muesli" breakfast show), and Martin Emery (Andy on the "Big Drive Home" drivetime show). The fictional radio station was created by Salford-based audio creative company Kalua, and its tagline is "Forever FM: playing timeless hits, now and forever".

In May 2016, filming began on the second and final series. On 3 December Peter Kay announced that the second series will be broadcast on BBC in April 2017. An exclusive scene was aired during Peter Kay's Christmas Comedy Shuffle on BBC One on Christmas Eve 2016. The first two episodes of the second series were given an advance screening at Vue Cinemas for Red Nose Day 2017. The full series was made available on BBC iPlayer from 11 April 2017.

On 2 May 2017, Kay announced that there would not be a third series or a Christmas special, however, on 17 November 2017, it was announced that a final episode would be broadcast in 2018, in addition to a one-off unscripted episode.

Reception
An exclusive screening of all six episodes of the first series was held in Blackpool on 28 March 2015, in aid of Chorley children's hospice Derian House.
The entire first series was briefly available on BBC iPlayer where it became the most watched series to be released as a box set. Critic Grace Dent wrote "I laughed over and over again, loudly and gracelessly, during BBC1's Car Share".

Episode list

Series 1 (2015)

Short (2016)

Series 2 (2017)

Final specials (2018)
Despite initially saying that the series ended with Series 2 Episode 4, on 17 November 2017 it was announced during Children in Need that the show would return for an unscripted episode, as well as a final televised episode to end the series in 2018. The unscripted episode aired on 7 May and the final televised episode, which sees John and Kayleigh beginning a romantic relationship together, aired on 28 May. Writing in The Telegraph Veronica Lee gave the episode five stars out of five, describing the final episode as "perfect, uproarious, adorable", while Simon Binns, of the Manchester Evening News, commented: "It's cheesy, feel good, but lacks the drama of the previous episode."

Audio special (2020)

References

External links
 
 
 
 

2015 British television series debuts
2018 British television series endings
2010s British sitcoms
2020s British sitcoms
Automotive television series
BBC television sitcoms
English-language television shows
Television shows set in Greater Manchester
BAFTA winners (television series)